André Ndamé Ndamé (born November 30, 1987) is a professional Cameroonian footballer who plays for New Star de Douala.

Career
Ndamé began his professional career 2007 for Union Douala and joined 2008 to Cotonsport Garoua. After two seasons for Coton Sport FC de Garoua returned in September 2009 to his youth club Union Douala.

References

External links

1987 births
Living people
Cameroonian footballers
Cameroonian expatriate footballers
Cameroon international footballers
2011 African Nations Championship players
Union Douala players
Coton Sport FC de Garoua players
Mount Cameroon F.C. players
Fath Union Sport players
Al-Faisaly FC players
Hajer FC players
Eding Sport FC players
New Star de Douala players
Saudi Professional League players
Association football midfielders
Expatriate footballers in Saudi Arabia
Expatriate footballers in Morocco
Cameroonian expatriate sportspeople in Saudi Arabia
Cameroonian expatriate sportspeople in Morocco
Cameroon A' international footballers